Dabhil is a small village located near the town of Dapoli, in Ratnagiri district, Maharashtra state in Western India. The 2011 Census of India recorded a total of 1,047 residents in the village. Specially known for non chamecalise pure Alphanso Mangoes which has huge demand in Kuwait, UAE South Africa and many more. Dabhil is 876.47 hectares in size.

References

Villages in Ratnagiri district